The rufous sparrows are closely related birds, sometimes considered to be the same species:
 Great sparrow
 Kenya sparrow
 Shelley's sparrow
 Kordofan sparrow
 Socotra sparrow
 Iago sparrow

See also 
 Rufous-backed sparrow (disambiguation)
 Rufous-crowned sparrow
 Russet sparrow

Birds by common name